John O'Flaherty may refer to:

Peanuts O'Flaherty (John Benedict O'Flaherty), Canadian ice hockey player
John O'Flaherty, former owner of John O'Flaherty House
John O'Flaherty (politician), member of the Wisconsin State Assembly

See also
John Flaherty (disambiguation)